Akbar Ismatullaev is an Uzbekistani footballer who plays as a defensive midfielder for Bunyodkor.

Honours

Club
Pakhtakor
 Uzbek League (2): 2012, 2014
 Uzbek Cup (1): 2011
 Liga 1

References

External links

Living people
1991 births
Uzbekistani footballers
Uzbekistan international footballers
Pakhtakor Tashkent FK players
Uzbekistan Super League players
Footballers at the 2014 Asian Games
Association football midfielders
Asian Games competitors for Uzbekistan